The  or Transmontano Mastiff is a breed of livestock guardian dog from Portugal. It originates in the historical province of Trás-os-Montes e Alto Douro in north-eastern Portugal, and is a rare breed confined mostly to this area.

History
The origin of this breed conjoins the history of all the Iberian mastiffs, and its evolution is linked to the transhumance route on the Iberian Peninsula. In ancient times, this molossus dog was found in the high regions of Portugal, in particular in Trás-os-Montes e Alto Douro Province. The breed is used to improve pastoralism by developing it as a livestock guardian dog, particularly against Iberian wolf attacks, that are always prolific in the area.  The breed has evolved over time with improved genetics through selective breeding for the conditions of pastoral farming.  It is thought by some that the breed is related to the Tibetan Mastiff, but no proof of this exists. It is related to the Rafeiro do Alentejo, the southern Portuguese cattle dog, which "for many centuries" would follow the cattle herd in their migrations within the country. As those migrations were curtailed, the two breeds diverged.

In the mountains of Portugal, which are characterized by steep fields of pastures and difficult road access, this breed has adapted to the conditions of the region (i.e., may be classified as a landrace), and to the types of cattle, sheep, and goats that have traditionally grazed in these areas.

Until the second half of the twentieth century, the region was primarily pastoral. This changed when the government of Portugal encouraged land clearance so that grain could be grown.  However, many of those areas have returned to their previous use as pasture.

This breed continues to guard extensive sheep flocks in the region, and more than 95% of the dogs are so employed.  As of 1995, the breed was exclusive to Portugal, with no known exports to other countries, and was rarely seen outside of the northern Iberian peninsula.  The breed has been imported to the US state of Oregon, as participants in an experiment to document the introduction and effect of "bigger" and "bolder" breeds than so-called "white dogs", i.e. the Great Pyrenees, Akbash and Maremma Sheepdog as a deterrent to predation by wolves.  This occurred in large part because of the reintroduction of wolves to northeast Oregon. Since their return in 2008 through 2014, Oregon Department of Fish and Wildlife documented "86 fatal wolf attacks on livestock."  A similar experiment with cattle herds was conducted by the USDA in Montana.

Description

Coat and color 
The breed has a short to medium coat with a dense undercoat, well adapted to the warm dry climate of the region. Generally the coat is white, with large patches of black, yellow, fawn, brindle or 'wolf grey'. It can also be of solid colour of fawn, yellow, wolf grey or brindle.

Size 
This is the largest of the Portuguese breeds.

It is a powerful, muscular and large breed with a broad muzzle and large head. They have moderately loose-fitting jowls and a single dewlap.

Temperament
They are first and foremost working livestock guardian dogs, and their development and temperament should be understood and appreciated in that context.

This breed has a calm and reserved reaction to threats, and is notably curious and intelligent.  An important attribute is its ability to work as a mixed pack with intact males and females; of course, younger males have to socialize to "temper their dominance" and adapt to working within the pack.  They have a natural predisposition toward digging under fences and "expanding their territory," which needs to be monitored and controlled.  They are high energy  fit, active, vigorous defenders of the flock, and well adapted to fending off wild boar, foxes, and wolves, which are the prevalent predators in the area.  Feral dogs are another opponent.  They are an "excellent night guardian."

"This dog is an athlete of all terrain able to make many miles along rugged landscapes, protecting both day and night his herd of possible threats. The largest of these is the Iberian Wolf, an endangered species that with the help of dogs of this breed can be preserved." Representatives were selected and imported to the United States for a United States Department of Agriculture study on use of dogs to mitigate wolf predation in the western United States.

They need large spaces and by nature like to roam free.  They are ill-suited to being chained or apartment living.  To cope with the heat, they like to burrow and make dens.

They are a good companion dog.  Females are generally more tractable and better companion dogs than males.

Like most livestock guardian dogs, they bond with the flock; they are independent thinkers; and they must be trained to respond to their master's voice.

Early training and socialization is essential.

The breed association counsels: "... like all shepherds, the Transmontano Cattle Dog is a dominant dog and a 'single owner' [dog]. And because he is quite jealous and possessive, it is important to emphasize the importance of education and socialization...."  They are possessive of toys and food, and owner control is essential.  They are highly trainable and responsive to positive dog training techniques.  They do not respond well to punishment, and have 'a long memory.'  They are high energy dogs that require a lot of space.

In the right environment they are very effective to protect an estate and flock.  They are well adapted to protecting flocks (and perhaps herds) from wolves; their use is also seriously being considered for the western United States.

Breed recognition
In 2020, the FCI provisionally recognized the breed. There is also a small breed association, and the government of Portugal maintains a breed registry and facilitates placement of Cão de Gado Transmontano for flock protection from wolves through its agency Parque Natural de Montesinho.

Grupo Lobo supports placement of these dogs to protect flocks from wolves; thereby helping to preserve the wolves (a protected species in Portugal) from human conflict.

See also
 Dogs portal
 List of dog breeds
 Spanish Mastiff, a similar livestock-guardian dog originating in Spain, used successfully in protecting flocks from wolves

Notes

References

Further reading

External links

FCI breeds
Dog breeds originating in Portugal
Livestock guardian dogs